Mahinda Parakrama Jayaratne (11 May 1967 – 15 March 1997) was a Sri Lankan cricketer. He played in six first-class matches between 1989/90 and 1992/93. He was shot dead by a gunman on a motorcycle as he helped with running a campaign in a local election.

See also
 List of cricketers who were murdered

References

External links
 

1967 births
1997 deaths
Sri Lankan cricketers
Kurunegala Sports Club cricketers
Place of birth missing
Male murder victims
People murdered in Sri Lanka
Deaths by firearm in Sri Lanka
Sri Lankan murder victims